Koski is a surname originating in Finland (in Finnish, it means "rapids"). Notable people with the surname include:

Brian Koski (born 20th century), U.S. commentator on football (soccer) talk shows
Darius Koski (born 1971), American guitarist and songwriter
Eetu Koski (born 1992), Finnish ice hockey player
Ilkka Koski (1928–1993), Finnish boxer, Olympic bronze medal
Jarmo Koski (born 1951), Finnish actor, voice actor
J. J. Koski (born 1996), American football player
Markku Koski (born 1981), Finnish snowboarder

See also 
 Kosky

References 

Finnish-language surnames